Dharmasiri Dassanayake is a Sri Lankan politician who is the current Chief Minister of the North Western Province. He was appointed to the position on 8 September 2015.

References

Living people
Year of birth missing (living people)
Chief Ministers of North Western Province, Sri Lanka